For the political history of New Zealand refer to:

Politics of New Zealand § History
History of voting in New Zealand
History of New Zealand

See also
Government of New Zealand
Prime Minister of New Zealand
Māori politics

Further reading

External links
Politics and Government at New Zealand History online
History of the Vote at Elections New Zealand
Government and Nation at Te Ara - The Encyclopedia of New Zealand